Barry County is a county located in the southwest portion of the U.S. state of Missouri.  As of the 2020 Census, the population was 34,534. Its county seat is Cassville. The county was organized in 1835 and named after William Taylor Barry, a U.S. Postmaster General from Kentucky. The town of Barry, also named after the postmaster-general, was located just north of Kansas City, not in Barry County.

Geography
Roaring River State Park is located in the southern part of the county, amid the Mark Twain National Forest.

Adjacent counties
Lawrence County  (north)
Stone County  (east)
Carroll County, Arkansas  (southeast)
Benton County, Arkansas  (south)
McDonald County  (southwest)
Newton County  (northwest)

Major highways
 U.S. Route 60
 Route 37
 Route 39
 Route 76
 Route 86
 Route 97
 Route 248

National protected area
Mark Twain National Forest (part)

Demographics

As of the census of 2000, there were 34,010 people, 13,398 households, and 9,579 families residing in the county. The population density was 44 people per square mile (17/km2). There were 15,964 housing units at an average density of 20 per square mile (8/km2). The racial makeup of the county was 94.09% White, 0.11% Black or African American, 0.86% Native American, 0.27% Asian, 0.03% Pacific Islander, 3.25% from other races, and 1.38% from two or more races. Approximately 5.04% of the population were Hispanic or Latino of any race. 26.5% were of American, 15.5% German, 11.7% English and 10.4% Irish ancestry.

There were 13,398 households, out of which 31.20% had children under the age of 18 living with them, 59.30% were married couples living together, 8.40% had a female householder with no husband present, and 28.50% were non-families. 24.70% of all households were made up of individuals, and 11.60% had someone living alone who was 65 years of age or older. The average household size was 2.51 and the average family size was 2.98.

In the county, the population was spread out, with 26.10% under the age of 18, 7.80% from 18 to 24, 26.10% from 25 to 44, 23.90% from 45 to 64, and 16.10% who were 65 years of age or older. The median age was 38 years. For every 100 females there were 98.30 males.  For every 100 females age 18 and over, there were 95.60 males.

The median income for a household in the county was $28,906, and the median income for a family was $34,043. Males had a median income of $25,381 versus $18,631 for females. The per capita income for the county was $14,980. About 11.80% of families and 16.60% of the population were below the poverty line, including 23.50% of those under age 18 and 11.90% of those age 65 or over.

Religion
According to the Association of Religion Data Archives County Membership Report (2010), Barry County is regarded as being a part of the Bible Belt, with evangelical Protestantism being the most predominant religion. The most predominant denominations among residents in Barry County who adhere to a religion are Southern Baptists (50.27%), Roman Catholics (19.26%), and United Methodists (4.67%).

2020 Census

Education

Public schools
Cassville R-IV School District – Cassville
Eunice Thomas Elementary School (PK-02) 
Cassville Intermediate School (03-05) 
Cassville Middle School (06-08) 
Cassville High School (09-12)
Exeter R-VI School District] – Exeter
Exeter Elementary School (K-08) 
Exeter High School (09-12)
Monett R-I School District] – Monett
Monett Elementary School (PK-02) 
Central Park Elementary School (03-04) 
Monett Intermediate School (05-06) 
Monett Middle School (07-08) 
Monett High School (09-12)
Purdy R-II School District Purdy
Purdy Elementary School (K-04) 
Purdy Middle School (05-08) 
Purdy High School (09-12)
 Shell Knob School District No. 78 – Shell Knob
Shell Knob Elementary School (K-08)
Southwest R-V School District Washburn
Southwest Elementary School (PK-04) 
Southwest Middle School (05-08) 
Southwest High School (09-12)
Wheaton R-III School District – Wheaton
Wheaton Elementary School (PK-06)
Wheaton High School (07-12)

Private schools
 St. Lawrence Catholic School – Monett (K-06) – Roman Catholic

Public libraries
Barry-Lawrence Regional Library

Politics

Local
Republicans control politics at the local level in Barry County, holding every elected position in the county.

State

All of Barry County is a part of Missouri's 158th Legislative District in the Missouri House of Representatives and is represented by Scott Cupps (R-Shell Knob).

All of Barry County is a part of Missouri's 29th District in the Missouri Senate and is currently represented by Mike Moon (R-Ash Grove).

Federal
All of Barry County is included in Missouri's 7th Congressional District and is currently represented by Eric Burlison (R-Ozark) in the U.S. House of Representatives.

  

Barry County, along with the rest of the state of Missouri, is represented in the U.S. Senate by Josh Hawley (R-Columbia) and Eric Schmitt (R-Glendale).

Blunt was elected to a second term in 2016 over then-Missouri Secretary of State Jason Kander.

Political culture

At the presidential level, Barry County is solidly Republican. Barry County strongly favored Donald Trump in both 2016 and 2020. No Democrat has carried the county's votes in a presidential election since Lyndon Johnson in 1964.

Like most rural areas throughout Missouri, voters in Barry County generally adhere to socially and culturally conservative principles which tend to influence their Republican leanings.

Missouri presidential preference primaries

2020
The 2020 presidential primaries for both the Democratic and Republican parties were held in Missouri on March 10. On the Democratic side, former Vice President Joe Biden (D-Delaware) both won statewide and carried Barry County by a wide margin. Biden went on to defeat President Donald Trump in the general election.

Incumbent President Donald Trump (R-Florida) faced a primary challenge from former Massachusetts Governor Bill Weld, but won both Barry County and statewide by overwhelming margins.

2016
The 2016 presidential primaries for both the Republican and Democratic parties were held in Missouri on March 15. Businessman Donald Trump (R-New York) narrowly won the state overall, but Senator Ted Cruz (R-Texas) carried a plurality of the vote in Barry County. Trump went on to win the nomination and the presidency.

On the Democratic side, former Secretary of State Hillary Clinton (D-New York) both won statewide and carried Barry County by a small margin.

2012
The 2012 Missouri Republican Presidential Primary's results were nonbinding on the state's national convention delegates. Voters in Barry County supported former U.S. Senator Rick Santorum (R-Pennsylvania), who finished first in the state at large, but eventually lost the nomination to former Governor Mitt Romney (R-Massachusetts). Delegates to the congressional district and state conventions were chosen at a county caucus, which selected a delegation favoring Romney. Incumbent President Barack Obama easily won the Missouri Democratic Primary and renomination. He defeated Romney in the general election.

2008
In 2008, the Missouri Republican Presidential Primary was closely contested, with Senator John McCain (R-Arizona) prevailing and eventually winning the nomination. However, former Arkansas Governor Mike Huckabee carried Barry County, receiving more votes than any other candidate of either party.

Then-Senator Hillary Clinton (D-New York) easily won Barry County during the 2008 presidential primary. Despite initial reports that Clinton had won Missouri, Barack Obama (D-Illinois), also a Senator at the time, narrowly defeated her statewide and later became that year's Democratic nominee, going on to win the presidency.

Communities

Cities

Cassville (county seat)
Exeter
Monett
Pierce City
Purdy
Seligman
Washburn
Wheaton

Villages
Arrow Point
Butterfield
Chain-O-Lakes
Emerald Beach

Census-designated places
Eagle Rock
Golden
Shell Knob (partly in Stone County)

Other unincorporated communities

 Cato
 Corsicana
 Jenkins
 Leann
 Lohmer
 Madry
 Mayflower
 McDowell
 Mineral Spring
 Osa
 Pasley
 Pioneer
 Pleasant Ridge
 Pulaskifield
 Ridgely
 Scholten
 Travers
 Viola
 Wheelerville
 Yonkerville

Townships
Barry County is divided into 25 townships:

 Ash
 Butterfield
 Capps Creek
 Corsicana
 Crane Creek
 Exeter
 Flat Creek
 Jenkins
 Kings Prairie
 Liberty
 McDonald
 McDowell
 Mineral
 Monett
 Mountain
 Ozark
 Pioneer
 Pleasant Ridge
 Purdy
 Roaring River
 Shell Knob
 Sugar Creek
 Washburn
 Wheaton
 White River

Notable people
 Clete Boyer – Major League Baseball player
 Curtis F. Marbut – Director of the Soil Survey Division of the U.S. Department of Agriculture (1913–1935)
 Scott Fitzpatrick – Missouri State Treasurer (2019–present)
 Don Johnson – Actor

See also
National Register of Historic Places listings in Barry County, Missouri

References

External links
 Barry County Genealogy and History 
 Digitized 1930 Plat Book of Barry County  from University of Missouri Division of Special Collections, Archives, and Rare Books
Barry County Sheriff's Office

 
Missouri counties
1835 establishments in Missouri
Populated places established in 1835